The MAMA Award for Best Male / Female Dance Performance (Solo or Group) (베스트 댄스 퍼포먼스 (남자/그룹 – 그룹/그룹)) is an award presented annually by CJ E&M Pictures (Mnet). Mnet is also the one who choose which group or individual will win to this category as well as other categories in MAMA.

It was first awarded at the 1st Mnet Asian Music Awards ceremony held in 1999; Lee Jung-hyun won the award for her dance performance in "Come", and it is given in honor for the artist/s with the best dance performance in the music industry.

History

Winners and nominees

1990s–2000s

2010s

2020s

Gallery of winners

Multiple awards for Best Dance Performance
As of 2022 (22nd MAMA), ten artists received the title two or more times.

Notes

References

External links
 Mnet Asian Music Awards official website

MAMA Awards